Hüttenberg is a market town in the district of Sankt Veit an der Glan in the Austrian state of Carinthia.

Geography 
The municipality includes the Görtschitz valley in the southern foothills of the Seetal Alps. On the north, it borders Styria. Neighboring municipalities are Reichenfels, Bad Sankt Leonhard, and Wolfsberg on the east, Klein Sankt Paul on the south, and Guttaring and Friesach on the west.

Personalities 
 Heinrich Harrer was born in the town and a museum is dedicated to him today.

References 

Cities and towns in Sankt Veit an der Glan District